Humber—St. Barbe—Baie Verte was a federal electoral district in Newfoundland and Labrador, Canada, that was represented in the House of Commons of Canada from 1988 to 2015.

Demographics
Ethnic groups: 96.2% White, 3.4% Native Canadian 
Languages: 99.3% English 
Religions: 73.8% Protestant, 23.2% Catholic, 2.1% No affiliation 
Average income: $20 573

Humber—St. Barbe—Baie Verte is the riding with the highest percentage of people with English ethnic origin in all of Canada (46.8% - multiple responses).

Geography
The district included the Great Northern Peninsula, the Baie Verte Peninsula, the area along the southwest coast of Notre Dame Bay, the Bay of Islands, and the Corner Brook area.  It also included most of Glover Island, the Grey Islands (Groais Island and Bell Island), and the Horse Islands.

The neighbouring ridings were Labrador, Bonavista—Gander—Grand Falls—Windsor, and Random—Burin—St. George's.

According to Elections Canada, the geographic boundaries for the 39th General Election (2006) were:

 "All that area consisting of that part of the Island of Newfoundland lying westerly and northerly of a line described as follows: commencing at a point midway between the towns of Triton and Leading Tickles in Notre Dame Bay; thence southerly in said bay to Seal Bay; thence southerly in a straight line to Frozen Ocean Lake at approximate latitude 49°11'N and approximate longitude 55°41'W; thence westerly in a straight line to Hinds Lake; thence southerly in a straight line to the mouth of Lloyds River at the westernmost extremity of Red Indian Lake; thence westerly in a straight line to Georges Lake; thence westerly in a straight line to Bluff Head on the eastern shoreline of Port au Port Bay. Including St. John Island, Quirpon Island, Sop's Island, Bell Island and Groais Island of the Grey Islands, Horse Islands and all other islands adjacent to the shoreline of the above-described area."

History
The electoral district was created in 1987 from Grand Falls—White Bay—Labrador and Humber—Port au Port—St. Barbe. Following the 2012 federal electoral redistribution, this riding was dissolved and divided between Long Range Mountains (80%) and Coast of Bays—Central—Notre Dame (20%), with the new boundaries taking effect at the 2015 federal election.

Members of Parliament

This riding has elected the following Members of Parliament:

Election results

Humber—St. Barbe—Baie Verte, 2003 Representation Order

Previous elections

Canadian Alliance changes from 1997 are based on the results of its predecessor, the Reform Party.

See also
 List of Canadian federal electoral districts
 Past Canadian electoral districts

References

Notes

External links
 Humber—St. Barbe—Baie Verte riding from Elections Canada
 Riding history for Humber—St. Barbe—Baie Verte (1987–1996) from the Library of Parliament
 Riding history for Humber—St. Barbe—Baie Verte (1996– ) from the Library of Parliament
 Election Financial Reports from Elections Canada

Corner Brook
Former federal electoral districts of Newfoundland and Labrador